The Battle of Ushant (also called the First Battle of Ushant) took place on 27 July 1778, and was fought during the American Revolutionary War between French and British fleets  west of Ushant, an island at the mouth of the English Channel off the westernmost point of France. "Ushant" is the anglicised pronunciation of "Ouessant".

The French commander was under orders to avoid battle if possible, in order to maintain a fleet in being. The commanders of the two squadrons of the British fleet were already personally and politically at odds with each other, and failed to make a concerted attack on the French.

The battle, which was the first major naval engagement in the Anglo-French War of 1778, ended indecisively with no ships lost on either side and led to recriminations and political conflicts in both countries.

Background
The French fleet had thirty-two ships-of-the-line, seven frigates, five corvettes and one lugger, commanded by Vice-Admiral Comte d'Orvilliers, who had sailed from Brest on 8 July. Keppel sighted the French fleet west of Ushant at just after noon on 23 July. Keppel immediately ordered his battleships into line and set off in pursuit. At around 7 o'clock in the evening, the French fleet went about and began heading towards the British. Keppel, who did not wish to engage at night, had his ships hove to in response. In the morning, d'Orvilliers found himself to the north-west of the British fleet and cut off from Brest, although he retained the weather gage. Two of his ships, standing to leeward, escaped into port, leaving him with thirty ships-of-the-line. Keppel tried for three days to bring the French to action but d'Orvilliers declined, maintaining his position upwind and heading into the Atlantic.

Battle

At 6a.m. on 27 July, with the British fleet roughly line-abreast, Keppel gave the order for the rear division, several miles away under Sir Hugh Palliser, to chase to windward. At 9a.m., the French, who had hitherto been sailing in the same direction, several miles to windward, went about once more. As the rearmost ships of the French fleet were tacking, however, the wind changed allowing the British to close the gap between them and their quarry. At 10:15 the British were slightly to leeward, line-ahead on the same course as the French. A little later, a change in wind direction brought about a rain squall which cleared at around 11 o'clock. A further change in wind direction to the south-west gave advantage to the British which d'Orvilliers sought to negate by ordering his ships about. The French, now heading towards the British in a loose formation, would pass slightly to windward.

The French ships were a few points off the wind and d'Orvilliers ordered them close hauled which caused the French line to veer slightly away from the British. The battle began at 11:20 when the fourth French ship in the line was able to bring her guns to bear. Keppel, who wished to save his salvo for the enemy flagship, received the broadsides of six French ships without reply. Once he had engaged the 110-gun , he continued to attack the next six ships in the French line.

Palliser's ten ships at the rear had not formed line of battle but were instead in a loose irregular formation. This was in part due to Keppel's earlier order to break off and chase the French ships to windward. Palliser's division therefore was badly mauled, having allowed itself to be attacked piecemeal. At 1p.m. Victory passed the last French ship and attempted to follow Harland but was so badly damaged in the masts and rigging that Keppel had to wear round and it was 2p.m. before his ships were on the opposite tack. It was about this time that Palliser in Formidable emerged from the battle, downwind of Keppel's division.

Meanwhile, the French line had tacked and was now heading south on the starboard tack and threatening to pass the British fleet to leeward. The French practice of firing high into the rigging had left several of the British ships disabled and it was this group that Keppel now stood down towards whilst making the signal, 'form line of battle'. By 4p.m., Harland's division had gone about and joined Keppel's ships in line but Palliser would not or could not conform and his ships, misunderstanding Keppel's intentions, formed line with their commander, several miles upwind from the rest of the British fleet. D'Orvilliers did not, however, attack the British fleet while it was divided into three sections but instead continued his course, passing the British fleet to leeward.

At 5p.m., Keppel sent the sixth-rate, to demand that Palliser join the main body of the fleet and when this failed, at 7, Keppel removed Palliser from the chain of command by individually signalling each ship in Palliser's division. By the time those ships had joined Keppel, night had fallen and, under cover of darkness, the French fleet sailed off. By daylight the French were 20 miles away and with no chance of catching them, Keppel decided to return to Plymouth to repair his ships.

Aftermath

France
The duc de Chartres, Louis Philippe II d'Orléans, a French Prince du sang (Prince of the royal blood), who took part in the battle, requested permission to carry news of its outcome to Paris and Versailles. He arrived there early on the morning of 2 August, had Louis XVI woken and announced a victory. Chartres was widely celebrated and received a twenty-minute standing ovation when he attended the Paris Opera. An effigy of Admiral Keppel was burnt in the gardens of his family residence, the Palais-Royal. Chartres then returned to Brest to rejoin the fleet. Fresh reports of the battle and Chartres' role then began to arrive in the French capital. Far from a victory, it was now reported as being at best indecisive, and Chartres was accused by d'Orvilliers of either misunderstanding or deliberately ignoring an order to engage the enemy.

Chartres was soon mocked by street ballads in Paris, and the embarrassment led to his eventual resignation from the Navy. He subsequently tried to gain permission to take part in a planned invasion of Britain the following year, but he was refused by the King.

Rochechouart was also the commanding officer of the Second Division of the White-and-Blue squadron. Trémigon was admonished, and Rochechouart was cleared.

Britain
A violent quarrel, exacerbated by political differences, broke out between the British commands. This led to two courts-martial, the resignation of Keppel, and great injury to the discipline of the navy. Keppel was court-martialled but cleared of misconduct in action. Much was made of the alteration of log books and missing notes. Palliser was criticised by an inquiry before the affair turned into a squabble of party politics.

Order of battle

British fleet

French fleet 
The French line of battle was in reversed order (the Régiment du Dauphin provided a detachment of marines during the battle).

Notes

References

Sources

 .
 
 
 
 
 
 
 
 
 

Ushant 1778
Ushant 1778
Ushant 1778
Ushant 1778
Ushant 1778